Biri, also known as Biria, Birri Gubba, Birigaba, Wiri, Perembba and other variants, is an  Australian Aboriginal language of the Mackay area of Queensland spoken by the Birri Gubba people. There are at least eight languages regarded as dialects of Biri, and two which are related but whose status is not yet fully determined (see the table to the right). All are covered in this article.

A grammar of Biri proper was written before the language became nearly extinct.  some of the dialects have been undergoing a revival for some years.

Dialects

The following languages are regarded as confirmed dialects of Biri by the AUSTLANG database maintained by AIATSIS. Only one alternative name is given, for brevity; most have many more. All of these dialects appear to be extinct; AUSTLANG shows no speakers for any of them since 1975.

E38: Garaynbal (Garingbal)
E40: Gangulu (Kaangooloo)
E48: Baradha (Thar-ar-ra-burra)
E51: Yambina (Jampal)
E52: Yangga (Jangga)
E54: Yuwi (Juipera)
E55: Yilba (Yukkaburra)
E57: Wiri (Widi)
E58: Giya (Bumbarra)
E59: Ngaro (Giya)
E63: Yetimarala / Yetimarla (Bayali)

Yuwi
E54: Yuwi (Juipera, Toolginburra, Yuipera, Juwibara, Yuibera, Yuwiburra, Yuwibarra, Yuwibara): Yuwibara is treated as a dialect of Biri by Angela Terrill, based on George Bridgeman and Pierre-Marie Bucas' list in Curr (Vol.3, pp. 44–51), having over 80% in common with Biri. However Gavan Breen assigns it to Wiri (E57) – another dialect of Biri – on the basis of geography and other evidence. AIATSIS had not  assigned a status to it.

Yuwi had no recorded speakers between 1975 and 2016 according to AUSTLANG, but efforts are being made to revive the language. After a group of Yuwi descendants had worked hard to revive the language, by January 2020 elders were able to conduct "Welcome to Country" ceremonies in language. It was a long process, which included Elders consulting with the State Library of Queensland, working on building word lists and developing a dictionary. The organisation First Languages Australia (a language advocacy body established in 2013) lends support.

The language and people are usually referred to as Yuwibara today, with a 2020 native title determination made in this name.

Ngaro
E59: Ngaro's status as a separate dialect is unconfirmed, with a Tindale wordlist being the only source. Breen  assigns it to Wiri (E57).

Gabulbarra
Gabulbarra is name for a people of Central Queensland, but little is known about their language. Gavan Breen thinks that they spoke a dialect of Biri, and the status of their language is recorded as "potential" on AUSTLANG.

Phonology

Consonants

Vowels 
Vowels are noted as /a, i, u/.

Peoples
The following peoples spoke the dialects of Biri mentioned above:

Baradha people
Biria people
Gangulu people
Garaynbal people
Giya people (Gia)
Ngaro people
Wiri people
Yambina people
Yangga people
Yetimarala people
Yilba people
Yuwibara people

References

Further reading

External links 

 Reawakening (Mackay) Community Language Journey Digital Story, State Library of Queensland

Maric languages
Extinct languages of Queensland